Only the Strong Survive may refer to:

 "Only the Strong Survive" (song), a song by Jerry Butler
 Only the Strong Survive (Bruce Springsteen album), an album by Bruce Springsteen
 Only the Strong Survive (Keith Frank album), an album by Keith Frank
 Only the Strong Survive, an album by Billy Paul
 Only The Strong Survive, a 1998 compilation album by REO Speedwagon
 Only The Strong Survive, a song by REO Speedwagon from Nine Lives
 Only The Strong Survive, a song by Gary Richrath from Only The Strong Survive
 Only the Strong Survive, a song by Bryan Adams from Into the Fire
 Only the Strong Survive, a song by Raven from Life's a Bitch
 Only the Strong Survive, a song by Laura Marling from Song for Our Daughter
 Only the Strong Survive, a 1995 film starring Cynthia Khan
 Only the Strong Survive, a 2002 documentary by D. A. Pennebaker
 "Only the Strong Survive", a song by Stuck Mojo from Pigwalk (1996)